Cypress Hills—Grasslands is a federal electoral district in Saskatchewan, Canada, that has been represented in the House of Commons of Canada since 1997.

Geography
The district is in the southwestern corner of the Province of Saskatchewan.

History
The electoral district was created in 1996 from Kindersley—Lloydminster, Moose Jaw—Lake Centre and Swift Current—Maple Creek—Assiniboia ridings.

This riding lost territory to Carlton Trail—Eagle Creek and gained territory from Battlefords—Lloydminster and Palliser during the 2012 electoral redistribution.

Members of Parliament

This riding has elected the following members of the House of Commons:

Election results

See also
 List of Canadian federal electoral districts
 Past Canadian electoral districts

References

Notes

External links
 
 Expenditures - 2008
 Expenditures - 2004
 Expenditures - 2000
 Expenditures - 1997

Saskatchewan federal electoral districts
Swift Current